The 2012 South Australian National Football League (SANFL) Grand Final saw Norwood defeat the West Adelaide by 49 points to claim the club's 28th premiership victory.

The match was played on Sunday 7 October 2012 at Football Park in front of a crowd of 29,661.

References 

SANFL Grand Finals
Sanfl Grand Final, 2012